Rumaki or rumake  is an hors d'oeuvre of tiki culture origin. It was popularly served at Trader Vic's and other Polynesian restaurants in the 1950s and 1960s.

Preparation
Rumaki's ingredients and method of preparation vary, but usually it consists of water chestnuts and pieces of chicken liver wrapped in bacon and marinated in soy sauce and either ginger or brown sugar, then fried or baked.

Etymology
One of the earliest references to rumaki is on the 1941 menu of the Don the Beachcomber restaurant (Palm Springs).

The name, like the dish, was probably invented at Don the Beachcomber. Its origin is unknown, although it could be short for Japanese harumaki 'spring roll'.

See also

 Crab Rangoon

References

Appetizers
Bacon dishes
Tiki culture
Food and drink introduced in 1941
Liver (food)
Food and drink in California